Ahead may refer to:

 "Ahead/Replay", Japanese song by Vamps
 Ahead Software, former name of the software company Nero AG

See also
 
 
 Dead Ahead (disambiguation)
 Go Ahead (disambiguation)
 Lookahead (disambiguation)
 Looking Ahead (disambiguation)
 Straight Ahead (disambiguation)
 Advance (disambiguation)
 Forward (disambiguation)
 Front (disambiguation)
 Onward (disambiguation)
 Progress (disambiguation)
 Readahead, a system call of the Linux kernel